Prized porker  may refer to:
Pig, a genus of even-toed ungulates
An item in the massively multiplayer online game Poptropica